The Kawasaki GPZ900R (also known as the ZX900A or Ninja 900) is a motorcycle that was manufactured by Kawasaki from 1984 to 2003. It is the earliest member of the Ninja family of sport bikes. The 1984 GPZ900R (or ZX900A-1) was a revolutionary design that became the immediate predecessor of the modern-day sport bike. Developed in secret over six years, it was Kawasaki's and the world's first 16-valve liquid-cooled inline four-cylinder motorcycle engine.

Prior to its design, Kawasaki envisioned producing a sub-liter engine that would be the successor to the Z1. Although its steel frame, 16-inch front and 18-inch rear wheels, air suspension, and anti-dive forks were fairly standard at that time, the narrow, compact engine was mounted lower in the frame, allowing it to take Japanese superbike performance to a new level. Six months after being unveiled to the press in December 1983, dealers entered three works GPZ900R bikes in the Isle of Man Production TT finishing in first and second places.

Description
Technical advances included water cooling and 16 valves, allowing additional power, and a frame that used the engine as a stressed member for improved handling and reduced weight, as a result of testing that showed that the standard downtubes carried virtually no weight and could be eliminated. Its top speed gave it the title of the fastest production bike at the time, and standing quarter mile times of 10.976 seconds, or 10.55 seconds recorded by specialist rider Jay "Pee Wee" Gleason. The 1984 GPZ900R was the first Kawasaki bike to be officially marketed (in North America) under the Ninja brand name.

In spite of its performance, the GPZ900R was smooth and rideable in urban traffic, owing to the new suspension and a crankshaft counter-balancer that nearly eliminated secondary vibration. The fairing's aerodynamics combined with good overall ergonomics enabled comfortable long-distance riding.

The GPZ1000RX was to be the replacement for the GPZ900R in 1986, but the Ninja 900 continued alongside the GPZ 1000RX. In 1988 the GPZ 1000RX was replaced by the ZX-10, yet still the GPZ900R remained. With the release of the ZZ-R1100 in 1990, the GPZ900R lost its status as Kawasaki's flagship model, but continued, with some revisions of the fork, wheels, brakes and airbox, until 1993 in Europe, until 1986 in the US and until 2003 in Japan.

The GPZ900R was featured in the movie Top Gun, becoming a cultural icon.

Notes

References

 
 

 
 
 
 
 

GPz900R
Sport bikes
Motorcycles introduced in 1984